Luray is an unincorporated community in Licking County, in the U.S. state of Ohio.

History
Luray was laid out in 1832. A post office called Luray was established in 1835, and remained in operation until 1844.

References

Unincorporated communities in Licking County, Ohio
1832 establishments in Ohio
Populated places established in 1832
Unincorporated communities in Ohio